Notre-Dame-de-la-Rouvière is a former commune in the Gard department in southern France. On 1 January 2019, it was merged into the new commune Val-d'Aigoual.

Population

See also
Communes of the Gard department

References

Former communes of Gard
Populated places disestablished in 2019